Cruel and Gentle Things, released in 2005, is the fourth studio album released by singer/guitarist Charlie Sexton.

Track listing

Personnel
Charlie Sexton - 6-String Bass, Cello, Composer, Drum Loop, Drums, Engineer, Guitar (12 String Acoustic), Guitar (Acoustic), Guitar (Baritone), Guitar (Bass), Guitar (Electric), Guitar (Rickenbacker), Guitar Loops, Keyboards, Mando-Guitar, Mellotron, Mixing, National Steel Guitar, Organ (Hammond), Percussion, Percussion Programming, Photography, Piano, Primary Artist, Producer, Pump Organ, Remixing, Tambourine, Vocals
Michael Ramon - Harmonium, Organ (Hammond)
Kevin Lovejoy	- Mellotron, Moog Synthesizer, Wurlitzer
Shannon McNally - Producer, Vocal Harmony
Jerry Jones - 6-String Bass, Vocals

References

2005 albums
Charlie Sexton albums